Séno is one of the 45 provinces of Burkina Faso, located in its Sahel Region. The name of the province comes from the Fulfulde seeno, for "sandy plain."

Its capital is Dori.

Departments
Seno is divided into 6 departments:

See also
Regions of Burkina Faso
Provinces of Burkina Faso
Departments of Burkina Faso

References

 
Provinces of Burkina Faso